Manakamana temple is the most famous temple situated in Tumlingtar about 5 Kilometers north of Tumlingtar Airport. It is in the north east of Tumlingtar bazaar on a bank of the Arun River. It is said that it was taken there from Manakamana of Gorkha. About a hundred old people live at the temple, and pray to God for their salvation after death. Every year thousands of people come to worship the Goddess and for fasting in November (on the eleventh after the New Moon of Kartik). 

The temple is in the pagoda style. The fair held in November is popular for singing, dancing and fasting.

Hindu temples in Koshi Province